C.D. Aguila is a Salvadorian professional association football club based in San Miguel. The club was formed in and played its first competitive match on July 27, 1958 when it played its first season in the Primera División. Aguila currently plays in the Primera División, the top tier of El Salvador football, and is one of three clubs, including Alianza F.C. and C.D. FAS, never to have been relegated from the league.

Honours 
As of 11 June 2014 Aguila have won 15 Primera División, one Copa Presidente and one CONCACAF Champions League trophies.

Domestic Competitions

League
Primera División
Winners (15): 1959, 1960-61, 1963-64, 1964, 1967-68, 1972, 1975-76, 1976-77, 1983, 1987-88, 1999 Apertura, 2000 Apertura, Clausura 2001, Clausura 2006, Clausura 2012

Cup
Copa Presidente
Winners (1): 2000

CONCACAF Competitions

Official Titles
CONCACAF Champions League
Winners (1): 1976

Players

Appearances

Competitive, professional matches only including substitution, number of appearances as a substitute appears in brackets.
Last updated -

Others
 Youngest first-team player:  –  Robin Borjas v Isidro Metapan, Primera Division, 1 December 2019
 Oldest first team player:  –  Luis Ramírez Zapata v TBD, Primera Division, 1992
 Most appearances in Primera Division: TBD –  TBD
 Most appearances in Copa Presidente: TBD –  TBD
 Most appearances in International competitions: TBD –  TBD
 Most appearances in CONCACAF competitions: TBD –  TBD
 Most appearances in UNCAF competitions: TBD  –  TBD
 Most appearances in CONCACAF Champions League: TBD –  TBD
 Most appearances in UNCAF Copa: TBD  TBD
 Most appearances in FIFA Club World Cup: 2

 Zózimo

 Most appearances as a foreign player in all competitions: TBD –  TBD
 Most appearances as a foreign player in Primera Division: TBD –  TBD
 Most consecutive League appearances: TBD –  TBD – from Month Day, Year at Month Day, Year
 Shortest appearance: –

Goalscorers
Competitive, professional matches only. Appearances, including substitutes, appear in brackets.
As of January 2022

By competition
Most goals scored in all competitions: TBD –  TBD, Year–Yesr
Most goals scored in Primera Division: TBD –  TBD, Year–Yesr
Most goals scored in Copa Presidente: TBD –  TBD, Year–Yesr
Most goals scored in International competitions: TBD''  –  TBD, Year–Yesr
Most goals scored in CONCACAF competitions: TBD –  TBD, Year–Yesr
Most goals scored in UNCAF competitions: TBD –  TBD, Year–Yesr
Most goals scored in CONCACAF Champions League: TBD –  TBD, Year–Yesr
Most goals scored in UNCAF Cup: TBD –  TBD, Year–Yesr
Most goals scored in FIFA World Cup: 1 –  TBD, 1982

In a single season
Most goals scored in a season in all competitions: TBD –  TBD, Year–Year
Most goals scored in a single Primera Division season: TBD –  TBD, Year–Year
Most goals scored in a single Apertura/Clausura season: TBD –  TBD, Year–Year
Most goals scored in a single Copa Presidente season: TBD –  TBD, Year–Year
Most goals scored in a single CONCACAF Champions League season: TBD –  TBD, Year–Year
Most goals scored in a single UNCAF Cup season: TBD –  TBD, Year–Year

In a single match
Most goals scored in a League match: TBD TBD v TBD, Day Month Year
Most goals scored in a Copa Presidente match: TBD TBD v TBD, Day Month Year
Most goals scored in an Apertura/Clausura match: TBD TBD v TBD, Day Month Year
Most goals scored in a CONCACAF Champions League match: 4 TBD v TBD, Day Month Year
Most goals scored in a UNCAF Cup match: 4 TBD v TBD, Day Month Year

Others
Youngest goalscorer:  –  TBD v TBD, Year Primera Division, Day Month Year
 Oldest goalscorer: –   TBD v TBD, Year Primera Division, Day Month Year
Most goals scored in CONCACAF Finals: TBD TBD, four in TBD.
Fastest goal:12 seconds –  TBD v TND, Primera Division, Day Month Year
 Fastest hat-trick: 8 minutes –  TBD v TBD, Year Primera Division, Day Month Year
 Most hat-tricks in Primera Division: TBD –  TBD, Year-Year
 Most hat-tricks in a single season: TBD –  TBD,2011–12 (7 times in league).

Historical goals

Internationals
First international for El Salvador: TBD v  (Day Month Year)
Most international caps as an Aguila player: TBD – TBD, 
Most international goals (total): 17 – Rudis Corrales, 
Most international goals as an Aguila player: 12 – Rudis Corrales, 

Award winners
Top Goalscorer (TBD)
The following players have won the Goalscorer while playing for Aguila:

 Salvador Zuleta (-) - 1963/1964
 Jorge Leonardo Garay (21) - 1996/1997
 Waldir Guerra (9)  – Apertura1999
 Mauro Núñez Bastos (20)  – Apertura 2001
 Mauro Núñez Bastos (15)  – Clausura 2002
 Alexander Campos (13)  – Clausura 2003
 Alexander Campos (11)  – Apertura 2003
  Nicolás Muñoz (14)  – Clausura 2007
  Nicolás Muñoz (15)  – Apertura 2011
  Nicolás Muñoz (12)  – Clausura 2012
  Nicolás Muñoz (12)  – Apertura 2020

 Club Records 
 Record Victory: 10-0 vs Juventud Independiente, August 24, 2008 (Primera Division) & 13-0 vs. C.D. Titan, 1958 (Segunda Division)
 Record Defeat: 1-5 vs Atlético Balboa, April 22, 2009
 Record Victory in the El Clasico: TBD-TBD vs C.D. FAS, Day Month, Year
 Record Defeat in the El Clasico: 1-7 vs  FAS, 16 May 2004
 Record Victory in CONCACAF Competition: Aguila 5-1 Robinhood 1976
 Record Defeat in CONCACAF Competition: Santos Laguna 5-0 C.D. Aguila, 2012–13 CONCACAF Champions League 
 Record Victory in UNCAF Competition: Aguila 3-0 Saprissa 1976, Once Municipal 3-6 Águila 1977, Águila 3-0 Saprissa 1977,
 Record Defeat in UNCAF Competition: Comunicaciones 7-1 Águila, 1983 
 Record High Attendance:

Streaks
 Most Wins in a Row:
 Most Draws in a Row:
 Most Loses in a Row:
 Most games Undefeated:

Other Records
 Most Goals In a Regular Season: 49, (Apertura 2001)
 Longest Period Without Conceding a Goal:
 First El Clasico and First Aguila Goalscorer: Saúl Molina 41st min, 17 May 1959
 First official game of CD Aguila: vs. C.D. Titan 2-2,  14 October 1956 in San Miguel
 First goalscorer of CD Aguila: Juan Antonio "Maquinita" Merlos vs. C.D. Titan,  14 October 1956
 Highest record signing''': Zózimo who signed from Porvenir Miraflores for a fee of $USD 500,000 in 1967.

International representation

Historical Matches

References

External links
 http://www.conetur.com/articulo.php?id=628&PHPSESSID=5748ee754cced3d78ffe5db823c8bf31

Aguila